The Amasa Farrier House is a historic house at 55 Central Street in Stoneham, Massachusetts.  Built c. 1865, this two-story wood-frame house is a well-preserved Italianate villa, with pilastered corner boards and a nearly flat roof with a deep overhanging cornice studded with paired brackets.  The house was built for Amasa Farrier, the town's surveyor and landscape designer.

The house was listed on the National Register of Historic Places in 1984, and is a contributing resource to the 1990 Central Square Historic District.

See also
Amasa Farrier Boardinghouse, a rental property owned by Farrier
National Register of Historic Places listings in Stoneham, Massachusetts
National Register of Historic Places listings in Middlesex County, Massachusetts

References

Houses on the National Register of Historic Places in Stoneham, Massachusetts
Italianate architecture in Massachusetts
Houses completed in 1865
Houses in Stoneham, Massachusetts
Historic district contributing properties in Massachusetts